Mark 1 torpedo may refer to:

 Whitehead Mark 1 torpedo
 Whitehead Mark 1B torpedo
 Bliss-Leavitt Mark 1 torpedo